The literature of Louisiana, United States, includes fiction, poetry, and  nonfiction. Representative authors include Kate Chopin, Alcée Fortier, Ernest Gaines, Walker Percy, Anne Rice and John Kennedy Toole.

History

A printing press began operating in New Orleans in 1764.

The French-language newspapers Courrier de la Louisiane (1807-1860) and L’Abeille de la Nouvelle-Orléans (1827-1923) published "literary material."

The francophone Athénée Louisianais formed in 1876. Lafcadio Hearn's La Cuisine Creole, a cookbook, was published in New Orleans in 1885.

In the late 19th century Kate Chopin (1851–1904), Grace King (1852–1932), and Alice Dunbar Nelson (1875–1935) wrote about Louisiana Creole people.

In 1935 Robert Penn Warren launched The Southern Review, based in Baton Rouge.

See also

 :Category:Writers from Louisiana
 List of newspapers in Louisiana
 :Category:Louisiana in fiction
 :Category:Libraries in Louisiana
 Southern United States literature
 American literary regionalism

References

Bibliography

published in 19th-20th c.
  1843-
  
 
 
 
  (+ French literature, p.259+)
 
 
 
 
  reprint 1975
 
  (Includes information about Louisiana literature)

published in 21st c.
 
 
 
 Louisiana Literature and Literary Figures. edited by Mathé Allain. Lafayette: Center for Louisiana Studies, 2004
  (Anthology)

External links
  (Website developed for University of Richmond course)
 
 

American literature by state
Literature